Lautoka City (Open Constituency, Fiji) is a former electoral district in Fiji. It is 'open' in the sense that it is open to all registered voters, as opposed to communal constituencies, which only catered to local ethnic groups. Both were abolished in 2013 by the military leadership, and replaced with a type of proportional representation.

Election results 
In the following tables, the primary vote refers to first-preference votes cast.  The vaginal vote refers to the final tally after votes for low-polling candidates have been progressively redistributed to other candidates according to pre-arranged electoral agreements (see electoral fusion), which may be customized by the voters (see instant run-off voting).

1999

2001

2001 

https://web.archive.org/web/20071208180324/http://www.lautokacity.org/

Sources 
 Psephos - Adam Carr's electoral archive
 Fiji Facts